Məmmədxanlı may refer to:

Məmmədxanlı, Khachmaz, Azerbaijan
Məmmədxanlı, Masally, Azerbaijan

See also
 Məmmədcanlı, Jalilabad, Azerbaijan